Bobot is a village and municipality in Trenčín District in the Trenčín Region of north-western Slovakia.

History
In historical records the village was first mentioned in 1332.

Geography
The municipality lies at an altitude of 240 metres and covers an area of 16.079 km². It has a population of about 725 people.

Genealogical resources

The records for genealogical research are available at the state archive "Statny Archiv in Bratislava, Nitra, Slovakia"

 Roman Catholic church records (births/marriages/deaths): 1725-1898 (parish A)

Notable people
Mikuláš Jozef Lexmann (1899 – 1952) Dominican priest

See also
 List of municipalities and towns in Slovakia

External links
https://web.archive.org/web/20071116010355/http://www.statistics.sk/mosmis/eng/run.html
http://www.bobot.sk
Surnames of living people in Bobot

Villages and municipalities in Trenčín District